Gary David Grant (born 18 June 1958), known professionally as Gary Martin, is a British actor who has been in the acting industry since the early 1980s. His first recorded acting credit is as a chauffeur in the television series Nobody's Perfect. He has since gone on to perform in over 60 roles, either as a voice actor or actor. Martin is well known for his vocal range, and has recorded voiceovers for multiple American and British commercials and film trailers.

Martin provides the English dub voice of Judge Bergan in the PlayStation 2 video game Final Fantasy XII.

Filmography

Animation
 Alice in Wonderland: What's the Matter with Hatter? (BKN Classic Series)
 BB3B – Dad (Simon), Announcer
 The Beano Video – Talent Contest Host, Pa, Hank, Narrator #1
 The Beano Videostars – Alien #2, Gnosher Narrator, Minnie’s Dad’s Boss, Plumber, Police Officer #1, Plug (singing), Pa, Hank, Party Sounds from Beano Town Narrator
 Bimble's Bucket – Sploot
 Boomerang – Bugs Bunny, Daffy Duck, Porky Pig, Yosemite Sam, Elmer Fudd (Looney Tunes marathon promotions)
 Bounty Hamster – Additional voices
 Budgie the Little Helicopter - Smashit the Bulldozer
 Busy Buses – Voices (season 2)
 Corpse Bride - General Wellington / Fat Chef
 The Dreamstone – Zordrak / Narrator (seasons 2–4)
 Dennis the Menace – Kevin Pie-Face, Mr. Pie-Face, Walter's Dad, Derek Cool, Various characters
 FernGully 2: The Magical Rescue – Mac / Goanna
 Furiki Wheels – Gordon
 Jack and the Beanstalk – Dark Riders
 The Baskervilles The Boss, various characters.
 The Jungle Book: Rikki-Tikki-Tavi to the Rescue (BKN Classic Series)
 The Legends of Treasure Island – The Merman Prince / Additional voices
 The Likeaballs – Dan / Invinciball / Destructiball
 The Adventures of Dawdle The Donkey - Narrator
 The Adventures of Pinocchio (1996 film) - Giant in theatre scene
 Metalheads
 Oswald – Egbert, Steve Tree, and Gingerbreadman (UK dub)
 The Prince and the Pauper: Double Trouble (BKN Classic Series)
 Quest for a Heart – Sage of the Sauna
 Fimbles - Additional voices
 The Story Makers – Narrator / Superbaby
 Molly's Gang – Homer / Duster / Hubble
 Mr. Bean: The Animated Series – Harry, additional voices
 Robin Hood: Quest for the King – Friar Tuck, Prince John (BKN Classic Series)
 The Magic Key - Mr. Robinson 
 The Snow Queen – Dimly
 The Snow Queen's Revenge – Dimly
 The Tale of Jack Frost – Various characters
 The Three Musketeers: Saving the Crown (BKN Classic Series)
 The Ugly Duckling – Jack Frost / The Winds of Winter
 Yoko! Jakamoko! Toto! – Jakamoko
 MacDonald's Farm – Neigh Neigh

Live action
 The Neverending Story III – Rockbiter / Mr. Rockchewer / Junior Rockchewer (voices)
 Red Dwarf – EpidemeSlaughter High - Joe

Video games
 Final Fantasy XII – Judge Bergan
 Killzone – Helghast
 Lego Marvel Super Heroes 2 – Hulk
 LittleBigPlanet 2 – Batman
 LittleBigPlanet PS Vita – Batman
 Star Wars: Empire at War'' – TIE Mauler Commander

References

External links
 

1958 births
Living people
British male television actors
British male video game actors
British male voice actors
Male actors from London
People from Ealing
20th-century British male actors
21st-century British male actors